Ayşegül Savaş is a Turkish writer who publishes mainly in American literary media. 

She was raised in Turkey and Denmark, then attended Middlebury College in Vermont. She graduated in 2007. She worked as a staff writer on The Middlebury Campus, writing often for the paper's arts section. She majored in sociology and anthropology. During her years at Middlebury she studied abroad in Russia (Yaroslavl) and France (Paris). She received an MFA at the University of San Francisco. Savaş teaches at the Sorbonne. Among authors who have influenced her, she names Patrick Modiano, Georgi Gospodinov, and Enrique Vila-Matas.

Short fiction and essays 
She has published short stories and essays in publications that include The New Yorker, The Paris Review, The Yale Review, Los Angeles Review of Books, Literary Hub, Granta, The Dublin Review, and Black Warrior Review.

Novels 
Her first novel was Walking on the Ceiling (2019), published by Riverhead Books. A reviewer in Booklist called it "deceptively simple and subtly profound." The second, published by the same publishing house, is titled White on White (2021). Anthony Cummins of The Guardian reviewed it favorably, noting that the writing style in the book is like austere painting.

References

External links 
 Savas' Homepage
 "Ayşegül Savaş on Desire and Disappointment"; interview with Cressida Leyshon in The New Yorker (January 24, 2022)

Middlebury College alumni
University of San Francisco alumni
21st-century Turkish women writers
The New Yorker people
Granta people
Writers from Paris
21st-century Turkish short story writers
Turkish women essayists
Year of birth missing (living people)
Living people
Turkish women novelists
Turkish women short story writers